Camden is an unincorporated community in Fresno County, California.

A post office operated at Camden from 1903 to 1904.

References

Unincorporated communities in California
Unincorporated communities in Fresno County, California